Van Patten Barn Complex is a historic barn complex located at Guilderland in Albany County, New York.  The complex consists of a dutch barn built about 1700 and two English barns built about 1830.

It was listed on the National Register of Historic Places in 1982.

References

Farms on the National Register of Historic Places in New York (state)
Infrastructure completed in 1700
Infrastructure completed in 1830
Houses in Albany County, New York
1830 establishments in New York (state)
National Register of Historic Places in Albany County, New York
1700 establishments in the Province of New York